Kuhsar is a city in Alborz Province, Iran.

Kuhsar may also refer to:
Kuhsar, Ardabil
Kuhsar, South Khorasan
Kuhsar District, in West Azerbaijan Province
Kuhsar Rural District (disambiguation)